Vervant may refer to the following places in France:

Vervant, Charente, a commune in the department of Charente
Vervant, Charente-Maritime, a commune in the department of Charente-Maritime